In psychology, empaths (from) are people who have a higher than usual level of empathy, called hyperempathy. While objective empathy level testing is difficult, tests such as the EQ-8 have gained some acceptance as tests for being empathic. Highly sensitive person is also often synonymous, but is also used to describe sensory processing sensitivity.

In parapsychology, the mechanism for being an empath is claimed to be psychic channeling; psychics and mediums claim to channel the emotional states and experiences of other living beings or the spirits of dead people in the form of "emotional resonance". 

The term empath is sometimes used in a broader sense to describe someone who is more adept at understanding, i.e. is more sensitive to the feelings of others than the average person, or as a descriptor for someone who is higher on an empathetic "spectrum" of sorts. Seen this way, an empath is someone who can perceive, understand, or share the feelings of another person, without necessarily believing said feelings are being directly communicated to them through some as yet unknown "second sight" mechanism or telepathic channel.

Paranormal concept 
The term's modern usage flows mostly from the work of American psychiatrist Judith Orloff. Orloff uses the term to describe people who have an innate ability to read the emotional state of others. She believes that empaths are able to sense the thoughts, feelings and energy of those around them, and that they are able to use this ability to provide healing or comfort to others, if they manage their condition correctly. For her part, Orloff believes her psychiatric colleagues to be "stuck in the Dark Ages".

Scientific research into normal human variation 

Although empaths are often associated with the paranormal, the concept has been studied and researched by scientists. Neuroscientists have found evidence to suggest that some people have greater or lesser ability to share and feel the emotions of others. They suggest that, on average, people who describe themselves as empaths have a greater ability to empathize than other people, and that this ability may be the result of a neurological difference, particularly in the responsiveness of mirror neurons. Mirror neurons are neurons that fire both when an animal acts and when the animal observes the same action performed by another. Interfering with the level of activation of mirror neurons via transcranial magnetic stimulation (TMS) has been experimentally studied.

In popular culture 
Online, self-describing empaths are sometimes mocked for using the moniker. Shane Dawson was mocked for using the term to describe himself after a poorly-received apology YouTube video in 2018.

Empaths have also featured in various works of fiction, such as the Marvel Comics character Empath and the Star Trek: The Next Generation character Deanna Troi.

See also 

 Artificial empathy
 Empathy-altruism
 Empathy gap
 Mirror-touch synesthesia
 Pathological altruism
 Superficial charm

References 

Empathy
Paranormal terminology
Parapsychology
Perception
Psychological theories
Synchronicity